William Schumacher Massey (August 23, 1920 – June 17, 2017) was an American mathematician, known for his work in algebraic topology. The Massey product is named for him. He worked also on the formulation of spectral sequences by means of exact couples, and wrote several textbooks, including A Basic Course in Algebraic Topology.

Life
William Massey was born in Granville, Illinois in 1920, the son of Robert and Alma Massey, and grew up in Peoria. He was an undergraduate student at the University of Chicago. After serving as a meteorologist aboard aircraft carriers in the United States Navy for 4 years during World War II, he received a Ph.D. degree from Princeton University in 1949. His dissertation, entitled Classification of mappings of an -dimensional space into an n-sphere, was written under the direction of Norman Steenrod. He spent two additional years at Princeton as a post-doctoral research assistant. He then taught for ten years on the faculty of Brown University. In 1958  he was elected to the American Academy of Arts and Sciences. From 1960 till his retirement he was a professor at Yale University. He died on June 17, 2017 in Hamden, Connecticut. He had 23 PhD students, including Donald Kahn, Larry Smith, and Robert Greenblatt.

Selected works

See also
Blakers–Massey theorem
Exact couple
Massey product

External links
Address at Yale

References

1920 births
2017 deaths
20th-century American mathematicians
21st-century American mathematicians
Topologists
Brown University faculty
Yale University faculty
University of Chicago alumni
Princeton University alumni
United States Navy personnel of World War II
People from Granville, Illinois
Mathematicians from Illinois
Fellows of the American Academy of Arts and Sciences